Zdeněk Kolář and Lukáš Rosol were the defending champions but chose not to defend their title.

Andrej Martin and Hans Podlipnik Castillo won the title after defeating Gonçalo Oliveira and Andrei Vasilevski 7–6(7–4), 3–6, [10–8] in the final.

Seeds

Draw

References

External links
 Main draw

Almaty Challenger - Doubles